Kenitra Province is a province in the Moroccan economic region of Rabat-Salé-Kénitra. Its population in 2014 is 1,067,435. It covers 3,052 square kilometers.

The major cities and towns are:
 Arbaoua
 Kenitra
 Lalla Mimouna
 Mehdya
 Moulay Bousselham
 Sidi Allal Tazi
 Sidi Taibi
 Souk El Arbaa

Subdivisions
The province is divided administratively into the following:

References

 
Kénitra Province